Andrew Turay is a Sierra Leonean politician. He competed in the 1996 presidential election as part of the National People's Party (NPP). He received 0.5% of the vote (3,925 total votes).

Turay was the candidate for the Convention People's Party in the August 2007 presidential election. He received fourth place and 1.56% of the vote. In early September, prior to the second round of the election, he announced his support for Solomon Berewa of the Sierra Leone People's Party (SLPP).

References

Year of birth missing (living people)
Living people
Temne people
United National People's Party politicians
Convention People's Party (Sierra Leone) politicians